12th TFCA Awards
December 17, 2008

Best Film: 
 Wendy and Lucy 
The 12th Toronto Film Critics Association Awards, honoring the best in film for 2008, were given on December 17, 2008.

Winners
Best Actor:
Mickey Rourke – The Wrestler
Runners-Up: Sean Penn – Milk and Jean-Claude Van Damme – JCVD

Best Actress:
Michelle Williams – Wendy and Lucy
Runners-Up: Anne Hathaway – Rachel Getting Married and Meryl Streep – Doubt

Best Animated Film: 
WALL-E
Runners-Up: Kung Fu Panda, Persepolis and Waltz with Bashir

Best Director: 
Jonathan Demme – Rachel Getting Married
Runners-Up: Danny Boyle – Slumdog Millionaire and Andrew Stanton – WALL-E

Best Documentary Film: 
Man on Wire
Runners-Up: Standard Operating Procedure and Up the Yangtze

Best Film: 
Wendy and Lucy
Runners-Up: Rachel Getting Married and WALL-E

Best First Feature:
Ballast 
Runners-Up: The Band's Visit and Frozen River

Best Foreign Language Film: 
Let the Right One In • Sweden
Runners-Up: A Christmas Tale • France, The Class • France and I've Loved You So Long • France/Germany

Best Screenplay: 
Rachel Getting Married – Jenny Lumet 
Runners-Up: Doubt – John Patrick Shanley and Frost/Nixon – Peter Morgan

Best Supporting Actor: 
Heath Ledger – The Dark Knight
Runners-Up: Josh Brolin – Milk, Robert Downey Jr. – Tropic Thunder and Philip Seymour Hoffman – Doubt

Best Supporting Actress: 
Rosemarie DeWitt – Rachel Getting Married
Runners-Up: Penélope Cruz – Vicky Cristina Barcelona and Viola Davis – Doubt

Rogers Canadian Film Award:
My Winnipeg
Runners-Up: Continental, a Film Without Guns (Continental, un film sans fusil) and Up the Yangtze

References

2008
2008 film awards
2008 in Canadian cinema
2008 in Toronto